Citrus Red 2, Citrus Red No. 2, C.I. Solvent Red 80, or C.I. 12156 is an artificial dye. As a food dye, it has been permitted by the US Food and Drug Administration (FDA) since 1956 to color the skin of oranges. Citrus Red 2 is listed by the International Agency for Research on Cancer (IARC) as a group 2B carcinogen, a substance "possibly carcinogenic to humans".

Properties
Citrus Red 2 is an orange to yellow solid or a dark red powder with a melting point of 156 °C.  It is not soluble in water, but is readily soluble in many organic solvents.

Use
In the United States, Citrus Red 2 is sometimes used to color oranges. It is only permitted to be used on the peel. It is permitted when the fruit is intended to be eaten, but is not permitted when the fruit is intended or used for processing, for example to manufacture orange juice. It is used on some oranges from the US state of Florida but is banned in the US states of California and Arizona.

References

Food colorings
Azo dyes
Solvent dyes
IARC Group 2B carcinogens